The Roosevelt Island Public Safety Department (RIPSD) in New York City provides safety and security service to residents of Roosevelt Island, and the Manhattan and Roosevelt Islands stations of the Roosevelt Island Tramway, because of the contract that the State of New York made with New York City in 1968 which gave the state a 99-year lease on the land. 

The department protects the island's property including all facilities by patrolling certain contracted residential buildings 24 hours a day, 7 days a week, but the New York City Police Department is responsible for providing policing service on Roosevelt Island. RIPSD officers enforce all laws on the island. 

The department has approximately 40 public safety officers who patrol the islands less than 1 square mile in area. On September 21, 2009, the department opened its new command center at 550 Main Street which permanently monitors an island-wide camera system and every vehicle that comes onto the island, as well as cameras on the Manhattan side of the tram, along the route and inside the tram cars. Public safety officers also monitor cameras in the Roosevelt Landings housing complex.

History
When the island was first developed and opened to the public for housing by the Roosevelt Island Development Corp (RIDC), security on the island was handled by security guards contracted by RIDC from City Security Guards Inc. from 1976–1978. In 1978, the contract was terminated and a full service police force was formed and law enforcement was handled by the Roosevelt Island Police Department (RIPD) from 1979 to 1981. 
In 1981, a name change happened and all officers were transferred to the NYS Division of Housing and Community Renewal Police (NYS DHCR Police) from 1981 to around 1985. Both police departments were staffed by peace officers and members had statewide jurisdiction and powers both on- and off-duty. 

Officers were armed with standard issue .38 special revolvers. Originally, RIPD/DHCRPD officers had state jurisdiction since they were employed as state officers. In 1984, the Roosevelt Island Operating Corp. was formed and all island operations were transferred to it. Not long after that (in 1985) the DHCR Police were disbanded and its staff were permitted to remain as security guards for RIOC, or could join other law enforcement agencies. 

The officers who stayed were now part of RIOC Security, with no special status and security type uniforms. A year or two later, after residents demanded a more professional, public safety-type force, RIOC formed the Roosevelt Island Public Safety Department. Its first patrol cars were red Ford Jeeps and the uniforms were changed to blue. Officers were given limited New York State peace officer powers and certain equipment but were still unarmed. 

Between 1971 and 1981, the RIPD's cars looked like the Port Authority's cars. They were blue with yellow tops and gray lines with the words "Roosevelt Island Police" written in red lettering. The color was changed in 1980 to white and a van was added. Between 1981 and 1985, with the name change to NYS DHCR Police, the cars looked like modern-day state trooper cars with the same graphics, but black with gold stripes instead of navy blue and "DHCR POLICE" instead of "State Trooper". 

In 1986, in the wake of a major news story on a duplication of services by a town police department in upstate New York, the then-governor, Mario Cuomo, started an investigation into duplicated services for police departments and, because Roosevelt Island was in New York City and the New York City Police Department was the responsible policing agency on the island, Cuomo then disbanded DHCRPD, along with about 15 police departments across the state. RIOC concurred with this move in order to have autonomy of its own public safety department. (At present, its vehicles are SUVs.)

Equipment and uniforms
RIPSD officers are not authorized to carry firearms. They wear dark blue uniforms with patches on the front and back and RIPSD patches on their arms, bullet resistant vests, a can of pepper spray, expandable PR-24 baton, flashlight and a digital radio that is directly linked to the central dispatcher and other public safety officers. The department uses marked vehicles. All officers are trained in basic life support.

PSD vehicles are marked as such and are similar to other NYC police vehicles; they are white with blue decals and have red/white flashing lights.

Power and authority
RIPSD Officers are designated New York City Special Patrolmen and are appointed in connection with special duties of employment, and such designation confers limited NYS Peace Officer powers upon the employee, pursuant to New York State Criminal Procedure Law § 2.10(27).

The exercise of these powers is limited to the employee's geographical area of employment and only while such employee is actually on duty as listed in Chapter 13 subsection (C): Special Patrolmen

Training
Officers complete a peace officers' course which includes training in law, police science, powers of a peace officer, self-defense/tactics, arrest procedures and basic life support/CPR. There is also an additional eight weeks of field training which new officers must satisfactorily complete as part of their supplemental training. For those seeking the certification, there is bicycle training.

Rank structure
There are six titles (referred to as ranks) in the Roosevelt Island Public Safety Department:

See also

List of law enforcement agencies in New York
Law enforcement in New York City

References

External links

Specialist police departments of New York (state)
Law enforcement agencies of New York City
Roosevelt Island